Let It Be most commonly refers to:

 Let It Be (Beatles album), the Beatles' final studio album, released in 1970
 "Let It Be" (Beatles song), the title song from the album

It may also refer to:

Film and television
 Let It Be (1970 film), a documentary about the Beatles album
 Let It Be (2004 film), a Taiwanese documentary about peasant farmers
 "Let It Be" (Grey's Anatomy), a 2005 episode of Grey's Anatomy
 "Let It Be" (Instant Star), a 2007 episode of Instant Star

Music
 Let It Be (musical), a West End musical using Beatles songs

Albums
 Let It Be (Bud Sank album), a 1970 jazz album featuring the Beatles song
 Let It Be (EP), a 1984 EP by Green Jellö
 Let It Be (Laibach album), a cover of the Beatles album
 Let It Be (The Replacements album), 1984

Songs
"Let It Be" (Labrinth song), 2014
"Let It Be", a 1996 song by Gotthard from G.
"Let It Be", a 2003 song by Benny Benassi from Hypnotica
"Let It Be", a 2018 song by Hayley Kiyoko from Expectations

See also
 Amen
 Laissez-faire
Let It Be... Naked, an alternative 2003 remix version of the Beatles album
Let It Bee, an album by Voice of the Beehive